Heinz Oskar Vetter (21 October 1917 – 18 October 1990) was a German trade union leader and politician.

Born in Bochum, Vetter completed an apprenticeship as a locksmith, before becoming a machinist at a coal mine.  He served in the Luftwaffe during World War II, before returning to mining.  He joined the Union of Mining and Energy (IG BE), and became a union representative, working full-time for the union from 1952.  In 1953, he joined the Social Democratic Party of Germany.

In 1960, Vetter was elected to the executive of IG BE, and in 1964 he became its vice-president.  In 1969, he left, to become president of the German Trade Union Confederation, serving until 1982.  From 1974 until 1979, he additionally served as president of the European Trade Union Confederation, and from 1979 to 1989 he served in the European Parliament.

References

1917 births
1990 deaths
German trade unionists
MEPs for Germany 1979–1984
MEPs for Germany 1984–1989
People from Bochum
Social Democratic Party of Germany MEPs